Victor Petrovitch Botchantsev (20 October 1910 - 30 August 1990) was a Russian botanist.

References

Soviet botanists
1910 births
1990 deaths